Cornelis Mension (11 March 1882 – 2 May 1950) was a Dutch painter. His work was part of the painting event in the art competition at the 1932 Summer Olympics. Mension's work was included in the 1939 exhibition and sale Onze Kunst van Heden (Our Art of Today) at the Rijksmuseum in Amsterdam.

References

1882 births
1950 deaths
20th-century Dutch painters
Dutch male painters
Olympic competitors in art competitions
People from Delft
20th-century Dutch male artists